The Fourth Season is the fourth album by the Australian progressive metal band Vanishing Point.

Track listing 
 "Embodiment" - 4:06
 "The Tyranny Of Distance" - 5:25
 "Surrender" - 4:09
 "Hope Among The Heartless" - 5:13
 "Gaia - The Path To The Unknown (Instrumental)" - 1:37
 "I Within I" - 4:03
 "Beyond The Open Door" - 4:04
 "Ashen Sky" - 4:59
 "One Foot In Both Worlds" - 5:32
 "Wake Me" - 4:32
 "Day Of Difference" - 4:53

Credits 
Silvio Massaro — Vocals

James Maier — Guitars

Chris Porcianko — Guitars

Simon Best — Bass

Chris Nativo — Drums

Vanishing Point (band) albums